The Ophidiasteridae (Greek ophidia, Οφιδια, "of snakes", diminutive form) are a family of sea stars with about 30 genera. Occurring both in the Indo-Pacific and Atlantic Oceans, ophidiasterids are greatest in diversity in the Indo-Pacific. Many of the genera in this family exhibit brilliant colors and patterns, which sometimes can be attributed to aposematism and crypsis to protect themselves from predators. Some ophidiasterids possess remarkable powers of regeneration, enabling them to either reproduce asexually or to survive serious damage made by predators or forces of nature (an example for this is the genus Linckia). Some species belonging to Linckia, Ophidiaster  and Phataria  shed single arms that regenerate the disc and the remaining rays to form a complete individual. Some of these also reproduce asexually by parthenogenesis.

The name of the family is taken from the genus Ophidiaster, whose limbs are slender, semitubular and serpentine.

Systematics
These genera are accepted in the World Register of Marine Species:

 Andora A.M. Clark, 1967 -- 4 species
 Bunaster Döderlein, 1896 -- 4 species
 Certonardoa H.L. Clark, 1921 -- 1 species
 Cistina Gray, 1840 -- 1 species
 Copidaster A.H. Clark, 1948 -- 3 species
 Dactylosaster Gray, 1840 -- 1 species
 Devania Marsh, 1974 -- 1 species
 Dissogenes Fisher, 1913 -- 2 species
 Drachmaster Downey, 1970 -- 1 species
 Gomophia Gray, 1840 -- 4 species
 Hacelia Gray, 1840 -- 5 species
 Heteronardoa Hayashi, 1973 -- 2 species
 Leiaster Peters, 1852 -- 5 species
 Linckia Nardo, 1834 -- 9 species
 Narcissia Gray, 1840 -- 4 species
 Nardoa Gray, 1840 -- 9 species
 Oneria Rowe, 1981 -- 1 species
 Ophidiaster L. Agassiz, 1836 -- 24 species
 Pharia Gray, 1840 -- 1 species
 Phataria Gray, 1840 -- 2 species
 Plenardoa H.L. Clark, 1921 -- 1 species
 Pseudophidiaster H.L. Clark, 1916 -- 1 species
 Tamaria Gray, 1840 -- 18 species

 Fossil genera
 †Chariaster
 †Sladenia

References

External links
 Classification of the Extant Echinodermata

 
Valvatida
Aposematic animals
Echinoderm families